The Queen's Award for Enterprise: Innovation (Technology) (2008) was awarded on 21 April 2008, by Queen Elizabeth II.

Recipients
The following organisations were awarded this year.

 4fx Healthcare Ltd of Mansfield, Nottinghamshire for baby nose-clear infant nasal aspirator.
 Academy of Contemporary Music Ltd of Guildford, Surrey for industry led music education.
 Activa Healthcare Ltd of Needwood, Burton-upon-Trent for leg ulcer and chronic oedema management.
 Aqualisa Products Limited of Westerham, Kent for digital showers using electronic control.
 Audio Network PLC of Halstead, Essex for production music and sound effects library service.
 Bernhard and Company Ltd of Rugby, Warwickshire The Express Dual and for the Anglemaster system for sharpening grass cutting blades.
 Callitech Limited (trading as Moneypenny) of Wrexham, Wales for business telephone answering and outsourced reception services
 Cattle Information Services of Rickmansworth, Hertfordshire for ‘Your Herd’ – a web-based programme of dairy herd management tools
 Checkmate UK Ltd of Melksham, Wiltshire for pneumatic dunnage to restrain marine cargoes.
 Diamond Consulting Services Ltd of Aylesbury, Buckinghamshire for ‘Idris’ vehicle detection products.
 DuPont Teijin Films UK Ltd of Middlesbrough for melinex polyester films.
 Eurobuns Ltd of Kingston, Milton Keynes, Buckinghamshire for manufacture and supply of frozen breads to the UK food service and retail food industry.
 Focusrite Audio Engineering Limited of High Wycombe, Buckinghamshire for ReMote SL with AutoMap – hardware control of music-making software.
 Greenbank Terotech Ltd of Swadlincote, Derbyshire for optimisation technology for large coal fired combustion plants.
 Healix Risk Rating Limited of Hampton, Middlesex for medical risk assessment system.
 I’Anson Bros Ltd (trading as British Horse Feeds) of Ripon, North Yorkshire for Speedi-Beet - a quick soaking sugar beet flake for horses and ponies.
 Image Processing Techniques Limited of Basingstoke, Hampshire for OmniTek XR purpose-built analyzer for digital cinema applications.
 KP Technology Ltd of Wick, Caithness, Scotland for the Kelvin probe - vibrating capacitor device for work function and surface potential measurements.
 Keela International Ltd of Glenrothes, Fife, Scotland System Dual for protection for extreme weather garments.
 Keepsake Card Craft (2004) Ltd of Oldbury, West Midlands for embossing boards with patented channels.
 KeyMed (Medical & Industrial Equipment) Ltd of Southend-on-Sea, Essex for i-SPEED high speed video camera.
 Land Rover of Gaydon, Warwickshire for Terrain Response - vehicle traction system.
 Leach Colour Ltd of Huddersfield, for STIK - the magnetic graphic display system.
 West Yorkshire liftshare.com Ltd of Attleborough, Norfolk On-line journey matching system to facilitate car sharing.
 Metryx Ltd of Nailsea, Bristol for mass metrology for semiconductor manufacturing processes.
 Owen Mumford Ltd of Woodstock, Oxfordshire for Unistik 3 safety lancets for blood sampling in hospitals and by patients at home.
 NMI Safety Systems Ltd of London N17 ‘Magic for seats’ wheelchair securement system.
 OneClick Technologies Ltd of Annesley, Nottingham for intelliPlug, intelligent energy saving mains adaptor.
 Ovation Systems Ltd of Thame, Oxfordshire for AfterBurner a 24-hour time lapse hard disk for DVD video recorder.
 Picsel Technologies Limited of Glasgow, Scotland for EPAGE: a graphics engine for mobile devices.
 Sohnar Limited of London W6 Traffic - a software programme to manage all aspects of a business in the creative sector.
 Speed-trap.com Limited (trading as Speed-Trap) of Newbury, Berkshire for software that delivers complete on-line customer insight.
 SunGard Public Sector Limited of Chippenham, Wiltshire for SunGard dS2000 – radio and telecommunications solution to enable a rapid response by emergency service organisations.
 Super Rod Ltd of Blaenavon, Pontypool, Wales for custom designed fibre-glass rods for installing electric cables.
 Syfer Technology Ltd of Arminghall, Norwich, Norfolk for flexicap, a novel termination of multilayer capacitors to prevent failure modes in electronic circuits.
 Symbian Ltd of London SE1 for the Symbian OS - advanced, open, standard operating system for data-enabled mobile phones.
 Thermoteknix Systems Ltd of Waterbeach, Cambridge for MIRICLE range of high performance ultra miniature ruggedised thermal imaging cameras.
 Thomson Scientific Limited of London EC1 THOMSON for pharma - online information for drug development.
 Titan Steel Wheels Ltd of Kidderminster, Three piece integrated flange wheel - for iF series.
 Transmille Ltd of Tonbridge, Kent for development of calibrator design and calibration systems.
 TrichoTech Limited of Cardiff, Wales for analysis of biological samples for substance misuse.
 Trinity Integrated Systems Ltd of Sale, Cheshire 100% migration of legacy safety PLC ladder logic to industry standard IEC-61131 function block code

References

Queen's Award for Enterprise: Innovation (Technology)
2008 in the United Kingdom